Silkworm is a horizontally scrolling shooter developed by Tecmo and first released for arcades in 1988.  In 1989 it was ported to the Amiga, Atari ST, Commodore 64, ZX Spectrum, Amstrad CPC and NES (1990) systems by The Sales Curve and released by Virgin Mastertronic.

Silkworm also spawned what many consider to be a spiritual successor to the game SWIV.  While SWIV was not a direct sequel, it followed the same core gameplay design of a helicopter/jeep team, albeit as a vertically scrolling shooter instead of a horizontally scrolling one. SWIV was described in the game's manual to mean both "Special Weapons Intercept Vehicles" and "Silkworm IV".

Release
Silkworm was released at a time where side-scrolling shooting games were among the most popular genres - it was released at the same time as Forgotten Worlds, Sanxion, Mr. Heli and DNA Warrior.

The Spectrum version took three months to develop and was converted from the Amiga version which was almost identical to the original.

The game reached number three in the UK Spectrum sales charts, behind RoboCop and Dragon Ninja.

In November 1990, Virgin would rerelease Silkworm as part of the Edition 1 compilation, which also included Double Dragon, and the shoot'em ups Gemini Wing, and Xenon.

Gameplay

Silkworm had interesting graphics and relatively fast-paced gameplay. The player can take control of a Jeep mounted with a machine gun or a Helicopter mounted with forward and downward firing guns. Two players can work simultaneously and cooperatively against enemies, with one playing as the Jeep and one as the Helicopter.

In single-player mode, it is generally easier to play with the Helicopter than with the Jeep. When in Jeep mode, the player needs to destroy everything directly in front of it or be prepared to jump in order to avoid collisions. 
In two-player mode, the Helicopter and Jeep must cooperate and the players depend on each other to succeed. For example, the Helicopter can only fire forward, so occasionally, the Jeep must cover the rear with his swivelling gun. However, when covering the rear, the Jeep is vulnerable from the front, so the Helicopter must cover him.

Silkworm featured a fairly wide variety of enemies, some of which had specific weaknesses, such as the armoured AA guns that could only be harmed when their shields were down to fire. Most famously, there was the "Goose" helicopter - a giant, heavily armoured "mini-boss" helicopter that was composed of several smaller vehicles connected together.

The players collect shields (which could alternatively be shot by the player in order to destroy all enemies on the screen), power cells which increase firepower and an additional bonus can be added to the score achieved. The game gets harder on the completion of each level, which feature destructible environmental elements, such as buildings and ancient ruins.

The speed was one of the defining parts of the gameplay, which the programmers who worked on the home conversions were keen to preserve, using a variety of programming techniques. One element that required work was the control system (the arcade original had three buttons, whereas most home systems had just one), but this was solved without much problem.

Silkworm featured a background music theme composed by Barry Leitch, which went on to be included on a Sinclair User covermounted cassette, along with  Shinobi and Continental Circus.

Final
Silkworm belongs to the games that "don't have a final": after a certain level, the game goes on infinitely. Despite many other games of this kind, however, after a certain level it says to the player that it's not going to accept any more coins to continue the current game.

It was thought computer conversions of this game only offered the player a notice as a final screen after beating a certain level, ending the game. The only exceptions being the Atari ST, Amiga and NES conversions where there is a final sequence and an ending. A video released by ChinnyVision in August 2019 disproved this and shows endings for the Amstrad CPC and Commodore 64 conversions.

See also
SWIV
Super SWIV
SWIV 3D

Reception

In Japan, Game Machine listed Silkworm on their April 1, 1988 issue as being the fifth most popular table arcade unit at the time.

The game was well received. Your Sinclair praised the 2-player mode and the sound effects.

References

External links

Feature on the game at VoxelArcade

Interview with the Amiga programmer Ronald Pieket Weeserik
Interview with the Atari ST programmer John Croudy

1988 video games
Arcade video games
Amiga games
Amstrad CPC games
Atari ST games
Commodore 64 games
Helicopter video games
Horizontally scrolling shooters
Nintendo Entertainment System games
Video games scored by Barry Leitch
Video games developed in Japan
Virgin Interactive games
ZX Spectrum games